Lord Norman may refer to:

Montagu Norman, 1st Baron Norman, British banker
Norman Smiley, British professional wrestler